Aptamers are short sequences of artificial DNA, RNA, XNA, or peptide that bind a specific target molecule, or family of target molecules. They exhibit a range of affinities (KD in the pM to μM range), with variable levels of off-target binding and are sometimes classified as chemical antibodies. Aptamers and antibodies can be used in many of the same applications, but the nucleic acid-based structure of aptamers, which are mostly oligonucleotides, is very different from the amino acid-based structure of antibodies, which are proteins. This difference can make aptamers a better choice than antibodies for some purposes (see antibody replacement).

Aptamers are used in biological lab research and medical tests. If multiple aptamers are combined into a single assay, they can measure large numbers of different proteins in a sample. They can be used to identify molecular markers of disease, or can function as drugs, drug delivery systems and controlled drug release systems. They also find use in other molecular engineering tasks.

Most aptamers originate from SELEX, a family of test-tube experiments for finding useful aptamers in a massive pool of different DNA sequences. This process is much like natural selection, directed evolution or artificial selection. In SELEX, the researcher repeatedly selects for the best aptamers from a starting DNA library made of about a quadrillion different randomly generated pieces of DNA or RNA. After SELEX, the researcher might mutate or change the chemistry of the aptamers and do another selection, or might use rational design processes to engineer improvements. Non-SELEX methods for discovering aptamers also exist.

Researchers optimize aptamers to achieve a variety of beneficial features. The most important feature is specific and sensitive binding to the chosen target. When aptamers are exposed to bodily fluids, as in serum tests or aptamer therapeutics, it is often important for them to resist digestion by DNA- and RNA-destroying proteins. Therapeutic aptamers often must be modified to clear slowly from the body. Aptamers that change their shape dramatically when they bind their target are useful as molecular switches to turn a sensor on and off. Some aptamers are engineered to fit into a biosensor or in a test of a biological sample. It can be useful in some cases for the aptamer to accomplish a pre-defined level or speed of binding. As the yield of the synthesis used to produce known aptamers shrinks quickly for longer sequences, researchers often truncate aptamers to the minimal binding sequence to reduce the production cost.

Etymology

The word "aptamer" is a neologism coined by Andrew Ellington and Jack Szostak in their first publication on the topic. They did not provide a precise definition, stating "We have termed these individual RNA sequences 'aptamers', from the Latin 'aptus', to fit."

Classification 
A typical aptamer is a synthetically generated ligand exploiting the combinatorial diversity of DNA, RNA, XNA, or peptide to achieve strong, specific binding for a particular target molecule or family of target molecules. Aptamers are occasionally classified as "chemical antibodies" or "antibody mimics". However, most aptamers are small, with a molecular weight of 6-30 kDa, in contrast to the 150 kDa size of antibodies, and contain one binding site rather than the two matching antigen binding regions of a typical antibody.

History

Since its first application in 1967, directed evolution methodologies have been used to develop biomolecules with new properties and functions. Early examples include the modification of the bacteriophage Qbeta replication system and the generation of ribozymes with modified cleavage activity.

In 1990, two teams independently developed and published SELEX (Systematic Evolution of Ligands by EXponential enrichment) methods and generated RNA aptamers: the lab of Larry Gold, using the term SELEX for their process of selecting RNA ligands against T4 DNA polymerase and the lab of Jack Szostak, selecting RNA ligands against various organic dyes. Two years later, the Szostak lab and Gilead Sciences, acting independently of one another, used in vitro selection schemes to generate DNA aptamers for organic dyes and human thrombin, respectively. In 2001, SELEX was automated by J. Colin Cox in the Ellington lab, reducing the duration of a weeks-long selection experiment to just three days.

In 2002, two groups led by Ronald Breaker and Evgeny Nudler published the first definitive evidence for a riboswitch, a nucleic acid-based genetic regulatory element, the existence of which had previously been suspected. Riboswitches possess similar molecular recognition properties to aptamers. This discovery added support to the RNA World hypothesis, a postulated stage in time in the origin of life on Earth.

Properties

Structure 

Most aptamers are based on a specific oligomer sequence of 20-100 bases and 3-20 kDa. Some have chemical modifications for functional enhancements or compatibility with larger engineered molecular systems. DNA, RNA, XNA, and peptide aptamer chemistries can each offer distinct profiles in terms of shelf stability, durability in serum or in vivo, specificity and sensitivity, cost, ease of generation, amplification, and characterization, and familiarity to users. Typically, DNA- and RNA-based aptamers exhibit low immunogenicity, are amplifiable via Polymerase Chain Reaction (PCR), and have complex secondary structure and tertiary structure. DNA- and XNA-based aptamers exhibit superior shelf stability. XNA-based aptamers can introduce additional chemical diversity to increase binding affinity or greater durability in serum or in vivo.

As 22 genetically-encoded and over 500 naturally-occurring amino acids exist, peptide aptamers, as well as antibodies, have much greater potential combinatorial diversity per unit length relative to the 4 nucleic acids in DNA or RNA. Chemical modifications of nucleic acid bases or backbones increase the chemical diversity of standard nucleic acid bases.

Split aptamers are composed of two or more DNA strands that are pieces of a larger parent aptamer that has been broken in two by a molecular nick. The ability of each component strand to bind targets will depend on the location of the nick, as well as the secondary structures of the daughter strands. The presence of a target molecule supports the DNA fragments joining together. This can be used as the basis for biosensors. Once assembled, the two separate DNA strands can be ligated into a single strand.

Unmodified aptamers are cleared rapidly from the bloodstream, with a half-life of seconds to hours. This is mainly due to nuclease degradation, which physically destroys the aptamers, as well as clearance by the kidneys, a result of the aptamer's low molecular weight and size. Several modifications, such as 2'-fluorine-substituted pyrimidines and polyethylene glycol (PEG) linkage, permit a serum half-life of days to weeks. PEGylation can add sufficient mass and size to prevent clearance by the kidneys in vivo. Unmodified aptamers can treat coagulation disorders. The problem of clearance and nuclease digestion is diminished when they are applied to the eye, where there is a lower concentration of nuclease and the rate of clearance is lower. Rapid clearance from serum can also be useful in some applications, such as in vivo diagnostic imaging.

Targets
Aptamer targets can include small molecules and heavy metal ions, larger ligands such as proteins, and even whole cells. These targets include lysozyme, thrombin, human immunodeficiency virus trans-acting responsive element (HIV TAR), hemin, interferon γ, vascular endothelial growth factor (VEGF), prostate specific antigen (PSA), dopamine, and the non-classical oncogene, heat shock factor 1 (HSF1).

Aptamers have been generated against cancer cells, prions, bacteria, and viruses. Viral targets of aptamers include influenza A and B viruses, Respiratory syncytial virus (RSV), SARS coronavirus (SARS-CoV) and SARS-CoV-2.

Aptamers may be particularly useful for environmental science proteomics. Antibodies, like other proteins, are more difficult to sequence than nucleic acids. They are also costly to maintain and produce, and are at constant risk of contamination, as they are produced via cell culture or are harvested from animal serum. For this reason, researchers interested in little-studied proteins and species may find that companies will not produce, maintain, or adequately validate the quality of antibodies against their target of interest. By contrast, aptamers are simple to sequence and cost nothing to maintain, as their exact structure can be stored digitally and synthesized on demand. This may make them more economically feasible as research tools for underfunded biological research subjects. Aptamers exist for plant compounds, such as theophylline (found in tea) and abscisic acid (a plant immune hormone). An aptamer against a-amanitin (the toxin that causes lethal Amanita poisoning) has been developed, an example of an aptamer against a mushroom target.

Aptamer applications can be roughly grouped into sensing, therapeutic, reagent production, and engineering categories. Sensing applications are important in environmental, biomedical, epidemiological, biosecurity, and basic research applications, where aptamers act as probes in assays, imaging methods, diagnostic assays, and biosensors. In therapeutic applications and precision medicine, aptamers can function as drugs, as targeted drug delivery vehicles, as controlled release mechanisms, and as reagents for drug discovery via high-throughput screening for small molecules and proteins. Aptamers have application for protein production monitoring, quality control, and purification. They can function in molecular engineering applications as a way to modify proteins, such as enhancing DNA polymerase to make PCR more reliable.

Because the affinity of the aptamer also affects its dynamic range and limit of detection, aptamers with a lower affinity may be desirable when assaying high concentrations of a target molecule. Affinity chromatography also depends on the ability of the affinity reagent, such as an aptamer, to bind and release its target, and lower affinities may aid in the release of the target molecule. Hence, specific applications determine the useful range for aptamer affinity.

Antibody replacement

Aptamers can replace antibodies in many biotechnology applications. In laboratory research and clinical diagnostics, they can be used in aptamer-based versions of immunoassays including enzyme-linked immunosorbent assay (ELISA), western blot, immunohistochemistry (IHC), and flow cytometry. As therapeutics, they can function as agonists or antagonists of their ligand. While antibodies are a familiar technology with a well-developed market, aptamers are a relatively new technology to most researchers, and aptamers have been generated against only a fraction of important research targets. Unlike antibodies, unmodified aptamers are more susceptible to nuclease digestion in serum and renal clearance in vivo. Aptamers are much smaller in size and mass than antibodies, which could be a relevant factor in choosing which is best suited for a given application. When aptamers are available for a particular application, their advantages over antibodies include potentially lower immunogenicity, greater replicability and lower cost, a greater level of control due to the in vitro selection conditions, and capacity to be efficiently engineered for durability, specificity, and sensitivity.

In addition, aptamers contribute to reduction of research animal use. While antibodies often rely on animals for initial discovery, as well as for production in the case of polyclonal antibodies, both the selection and production of aptamers is typically animal-free. However, phage display methods allow for selection of antibodies in vitro, followed by production from a monoclonal cell line, avoiding the use of animals entirely.

Controlled release of therapeutics 
The ability of aptamers to reversibly bind molecules such as proteins has generated increasing interest in using them to facilitate controlled release of therapeutic biomolecules, such as growth factors. This can be accomplished by tuning the binding strength to passively release the growth factors, along with active release via mechanisms such as hybridization of the aptamer with complementary oligonucleotides or unfolding of the aptamer due to cellular traction forces.

AptaBiD
AptaBiD (Aptamer-Facilitated Biomarker Discovery) is an aptamer-based method for biomarker discovery.

Peptide Aptamers
While most aptamers are based on DNA, RNA, or XNA, peptide aptamers are artificial proteins selected or engineered to bind specific target molecules.

Structure 

Peptide aptamers consist of one or more peptide loops of variable sequence displayed by a protein scaffold. Derivatives known as tadpoles, in which peptide aptamer "heads" are covalently linked to unique sequence double-stranded DNA "tails", allow quantification of scarce target molecules in mixtures by PCR (using, for example, the quantitative real-time polymerase chain reaction) of their DNA tails. The peptides that form the aptamer variable regions are synthesized as part of the same polypeptide chain as the scaffold and are constrained at their N and C termini by linkage to it. This double structural constraint decreases the diversity of the 3D structures that the variable regions can adopt, and this reduction in structural diversity lowers the entropic cost of molecular binding when interaction with the target causes the variable regions to adopt a uniform structure.

Selection 

The most common peptide aptamer selection system is the yeast two-hybrid system. Peptide aptamers can also be selected from combinatorial peptide libraries constructed by phage display and other surface display technologies such as mRNA display, ribosome display, bacterial display and yeast display. These experimental procedures are also known as biopanning. All the peptides panned from combinatorial peptide libraries have been stored in the MimoDB database.

Applications 

Libraries of peptide aptamers have been used as "mutagens", in studies in which an investigator introduces a library that expresses different peptide aptamers into a cell population, selects for a desired phenotype, and identifies those aptamers that cause the phenotype. The investigator then uses those aptamers as baits, for example in yeast two-hybrid screens to identify the cellular proteins targeted by those aptamers. Such experiments identify particular proteins bound by the aptamers, and protein interactions that the aptamers disrupt, to cause the phenotype. In addition, peptide aptamers derivatized with appropriate functional moieties can cause specific post-translational modification of their target proteins, or change the subcellular localization of the targets.

Applications

Industry and Research Community 
Commercial products and companies based on aptamers include the drug Macugen (pegaptanib) and the clinical diagnostic company SomaLogic. The International Society on Aptamers (INSOAP), a professional society for the aptamer research community, publishes a journal devoted to the topic, Aptamers. Apta-index is a current database cataloging and simplifying the ordering process for over 700 aptamers.

See also

References

Further reading 

 
 
 
 
 
 
 
 
 
 Cho EJ, Lee JW, Ellington, AD
 

Genetics techniques
Nucleic acids
Peptides
Biotechnology